Patrick Wauchope (1 May 1863 – 9 January 1939) was a Scotland international rugby union player.

Rugby Union career

Amateur career

He went to Fettes College and played for the school.

Wauchope played rugby union for Fettesian-Lorettonians and Edinburgh Wanderers.

He also played for Edinburgh University.

Provincial career

He played for East of Scotland District in their match against West of Scotland District on 30 January 1886.

He played for Edinburgh District later that year in the December inter-city match against Glasgow District on 4 December 1886.

International career

He played 6 matches for Scotland from 1885 to 1887.

Golf career

He was a keen golfer, but he was better known for improving the layout of Muirfield Golf Course to make it suitable for hosting championship matches. He was a member of Kilspindie and Dornoch Golf Courses; as well as being a member of the Honourable Company of Edinburgh Golfers.

Law career

He was a writer to the Signet. He worked for the firm Campbell and Don Wauchope.

Family

He was born to John Don Wauchope (1816-1893) and Bethia Hamilton Buchanan (1827-1911). His family had a baronet and this passed to one of his brothers Sir John Don Wauchope, who was a chair of Midlothian County Council. Another brother Andrew Wauchope also played rugby union for Scotland.

He married Georgiana Renira Buchan Fitzjohn (1867-1928) on 10 June 1897. They had one son, also named Patrick Wauchope (1898-1989). His son, who was a keen cricketer for Edinburgh Academicals, became a farmer in Natal, South Africa.

References

1863 births
1939 deaths
Scottish rugby union players
Scotland international rugby union players
Edinburgh District (rugby union) players
East of Scotland District players
Fettesian-Lorretonian rugby union players
Edinburgh Wanderers RFC players
Rugby union players from West Lothian